Uwe Bewersdorf (born 4 November 1958 in Freital, Bezirk Dresden, East Germany) is a German former pair skater.

Uwe Bewersdorf was a pair with Manuela Mager. He started to skate with the age of 7 at the club Betriebs-Sportbund-Gemeinschaft Post Dresden. Later the club was renamed into SC Einheit Dresden. He was representing East Germany (GDR). His coach was Uta Hohenhaus. 

The pair Mager/Bewersdorf was the first in the world to execute in competition a clean thrown loop. Because Manuela Mager finished her figure skating career in 1980 he had to change his skating partner. He teamed up with Marina Schulz. However the pair could not qualify for international competitions due to many injuries.

Uwe Bewersdorf studied sport at the DHfK in Leipzig.

He works as a tax accountant in Baden-Württemberg.

Uwe Bewersdorf's name is sometimes spelled with double “F“ in the end. This happened due to a mistake of German Bureaucracy. His parents are spelled with a single “F”.

Results
pairs (with Mager)

References

External links

 
 Uwe Bewersdorf – 1980 Olympic results at Sports Reference

1958 births
Living people
People from Freital
People from Bezirk Dresden
German male pair skaters
Sportspeople from Saxony
Olympic figure skaters of East Germany
Figure skaters at the 1980 Winter Olympics
Olympic bronze medalists for East Germany
Olympic medalists in figure skating
World Figure Skating Championships medalists
European Figure Skating Championships medalists
Medalists at the 1980 Winter Olympics